Fernando Ruiz de Castro Andrade y Portugal  (14 December 1548 - 20 September 1601) was a Galician (Spanish) nobleman who was  Viceroy of Naples from 1599 to 1601. He was the 6th Count of Lemos, an old title from Galicia, centered in the lands around the town of Monforte de Lemos. He was also 3rd Marquis of Sarria and a grandee of Spain.

He was born at Lerma. Philosopher Tommaso Campanella was incarcerated during his tenure in Naples (1599). He also ordered the construction of Royal Palace of Naples, designed by Domenico Fontana.

Fernando Ruiz de Castro died in Naples two years later. His second son Francisco Ruiz de Castro succeeded him as viceroy of Naples.

External links 

1548 births
1601 deaths
People from the Province of Burgos
Viceroys of Naples
Counts of Lemos
Grandees of Spain